Robert Brown  (6 July 1844 - 16 October 1912) was a British solicitor and classical philologist.

Biography
Brown was born in Barton-upon-Humber. He attended Cheltenham College and subsequently worked as a solicitor. Browns academic work focussed on writing about ancient religion, mythology, and Babylonian astronomy. Brown was a Fellow of the Society of Antiquaries of London and a Member of the Royal Astronomical Society. 

A memorial window in St Peter's Church is dedicated to Brown.

Selected publications
Brown, R. 1881. Unicorn: A mythological investigation.
Brown, R. 1885. The Phainomena; Or, Heavenly Display of Aratos Done Into English Verse.
Brown, R. 1898. Semitic Influence in Hellenic Mythology.
Brown, R. 1899. Researches into the Origin of the Primitive Constellations of Greeks, Phoenicians, and Babylonians.
Brown, R. 1906. Notes on the Earlier History of Barton-on-Humber (Vol I). London.
Brown, R. 1908. Notes on the Earlier History of Barton-on-Humber (Vol II). London.

References

1844 births
1912 deaths
People from Barton-upon-Humber
Fellows of the Society of Antiquaries of London
British solicitors
British classical philologists